Burton M. Tansky (born November 30, 1937, in Pittsburgh, Pennsylvania) is an American department store executive who  retired as  president and chief executive officer of The Neiman Marcus Group summer  of 2010.

Before being named CEO in May 2001, he was the company's president and chief operating officer. He was executive vice president from February 1998 until December 1998 and he served as chairman and chief executive officer of Neiman Marcus Stores, the $2.14 billion retail operating division of the company, from May 1994 until February 1998. He also served as chairman and chief executive officer of Bergdorf Goodman from 1990 until 1994. Previously, he served as president of Saks Fifth Avenue.

A 1961 graduate of the University of Pittsburgh, Tansky began his career in his hometown of Pittsburgh, Pennsylvania as an assistant buyer at Kaufmann's. He also worked for Filene's (Boston, Massachusetts), Rike's (Dayton, Ohio), Forbes & Wallace (Springfield, Massachusetts), I. Magnin (San Francisco, California), and Saks Fifth Avenue (New York City) before joining the Neiman Marcus Group in 1990.

Tansky has been accorded numerous honors, among them the Superstar Award from Fashion Group International in 2006, a Visionaries! Award in 2005 from the Museum of Arts and Design, the 2004 Gold Medal Award from the National Retail Federation (considered the highest honor in retailing), and, in 2002, appointment as a “Chevalier de la Legion d'Honneur” by the French government for his promotion of French-made merchandise in America. He has also been honored for his work with the National Alliance for Autism Research (NAAR).

Burton Tansky was born to Harry and Jeannette Tansky, who, fleeing religious persecution, immigrated to Pittsburgh from Poland and Russia respectively in the early 20th century. The couple operated a hair salon in the fashionable William Penn Hotel in Downtown, Pittsburgh. They raised three children, Burt, Shirley, and Eva, in the neighborhood of East Liberty. Burton is a graduate of Peabody High School.

References

Joyce Gannon (2007). Pittsburgh Post-Gazette: Profile of Burton Tansky. Retrieved November 18, 2007.
Maria Halkias (2010). Dallas News: Retiring Neiman Marcus CEO. Retrieved October 7, 2010.
David Moin (October 6, 2010). "Burt Tansky: Riding the Luxury Wave". Women's Wear Daily.

1937 births
Living people
University of Pittsburgh alumni
Businesspeople from Pittsburgh
Chevaliers of the Légion d'honneur
American chief operating officers
American retail chief executives